A reporter is a journalist.

Reporter(s) may also refer to:

Court reporter,  a person whose occupation is to transcribe spoken or recorded speech into written form to produce official transcripts of court hearings, depositions and other official proceedings.
Law report, a reference book of legal decisions
Reporter (Scotland), a public official in Scotland
Reporter (film), a 2009 documentary
Reporter gene, a type of gene
Reporter TV, a Malayalam-language news channel
Northrop F-15 Reporter, a reconnaissance aircraft
Reporter: A Memoir, autobiography of Seymour Hersh
Reporters (TV programme), a British television news programme on BBC News
Reporters (Indian TV series), an Indian newsroom drama television series
Reporter, a newspaper published by the Lutheran Church–Missouri Synod
The Reporter, journal succeeding the Anti-Slavery Reporter

See also
Rapporteur, from the same root word
The Reporter (disambiguation)